Călmățuiu is a commune in Teleorman County, Muntenia, Romania. It is composed of four villages: Bujoru, Caravaneți, Călmățuiu and Nicolae Bălcescu. The river Călmățui passes through the commune.

References

Communes in Teleorman County
Localities in Muntenia